Dicksonton is an extinct town in Perry County, in the U.S. state of Ohio.

History
Dicksonton was established in 1875 by George Detwiler and W. H. Price as a mining community for both coal and iron ore. By 1883 the town had about 100 inhabitants, a general store and a post office. The coal mine and the store closed in 1897. The Dicksonton post office was discontinued in 1908.

References

Geography of Perry County, Ohio
Ghost towns in Ohio
1875 establishments in Ohio
Populated places established in 1875